John Adams Cummings  (January 16, 1838 – January 6, 1887) was a Massachusetts politician who served as the fifth Mayor of Somerville, Massachusetts.

From 1872 to 1874 Cummings was the publisher of The Somerville Journal.

Notes

1838 births
1887 deaths
American newspaper people
American newspaper publishers (people)
People of Massachusetts in the American Civil War
People of New Hampshire in the American Civil War
Editors of Massachusetts newspapers
Members of the Massachusetts House of Representatives
Mayors of Somerville, Massachusetts
Massachusetts city council members
19th-century American journalists
American male journalists
19th-century American male writers
19th-century American politicians
People from Nelson, New Hampshire
19th-century American businesspeople